The 2016 Slovak Open was a professional tennis tournament played on indoor hard courts. It was the 17th edition of the tournament which was part of the 2016 ATP Challenger Tour. It was also the 8th edition of the tournament which was part of the ITF Women's Circuit. It took place in Bratislava, Slovakia between 7 and 13 November 2016.

Men's singles main-draw entrants

Seeds

 1 Rankings are as of October 31, 2016.

Other entrants
The following players received wildcards into the singles main draw:
  Lukáš Klein
  Tomáš Líška
  Alex Molčan
  Patrik Néma

The following player received entry to the main draw using a protected ranking:
  Cedrik-Marcel Stebe
 
The following players received entry from the qualifying draw:
  Patrik Fabian 
  Filip Horanský
  Petr Michnev
  Sebastian Ofner

Women's singles main-draw entrants

Seeds

 1 Rankings are as of October 31, 2016.

Other entrants
The following players received wildcards into the singles main draw:
  Magdaléna Pantůčková
  Kristína Schmiedlová
  Chantal Škamlová
  Natália Vajdová
 
The following players received entry from the qualifying draw:
  Maja Chwalińska
  Lenka Juríková
  Diāna Marcinkēviča
  Barbora Miklová
  Silvia Njirić
  Anastasia Pribylova
  Bibiane Schoofs
  Kimberley Zimmermann

Champions

Men's singles

 Norbert Gombos def.  Marius Copil, 7–6(10–8), 4–6, 6–3

Women's singles
 Andreea Mitu def.  Denisa Allertová, 6–2, 6–3

Men's doubles

 Ken Skupski /  Neal Skupski def.  Purav Raja /  Divij Sharan, 4–6, 6–3, [10–5]

Women's doubles
 Jocelyn Rae /  Anna Smith def.  Quirine Lemoine /  Eva Wacanno, 6–3, 6–2

External links
Official Website

Slovak Open
Slovak Open
Slovak Open
Hard court tennis tournaments
Tennis tournaments in Slovakia
Slovak Open
Slovak Open